After the Morning is the sixth album by Irish band The Sands Family and the first recorded after the death of Eugene Sands who was killed in November 1975 in a motor accident in Germany. It was released in 1976 in Ireland by EMI Ireland and produced by Leo O'Kelly.

Track listing
All songs are traditional except where noted. All arrangements by The Sands Family.

Personnel
The Sands Family
Tommy Sands – vocals, guitar, five-strings banjo
Anne Sands – vocals, bodhran
Ben Sands – vocals, guitar, mandolin, tin whistle, fiddles, sitar, viola
Colum Sands – vocals, guitar, double bass, fiddles, bouzouki, dulcimer, tenor banjo

Production
Leo O'Kelly – production
Bob Harper – engineering
Ronnie Norton – cover design
Gangolf Dörr – front cover photography
Bobby Hanvey & Irish Press – back cover photography

Release history

References and notes

1976 albums
The Sands Family albums
Albums produced by Leo O'Kelly
EMI Records albums